Capital punishment in Luxembourg was abolished for all crimes in 1979.

The last execution in Luxembourg took place in 1949.

Luxembourg is a member of the European Union and of the Council of Europe; and has also signed and ratified Protocol no.13. Luxembourg is also a state party to the Second Optional Protocol to the International Covenant on Civil and Political Rights; it signed the treaty on 13 February 1990 and ratified it on 12 February 1992. Luxembourg voted in favor of the United Nations moratorium on the death penalty all eight times, in 2007, 2008, 2010, 2012, 2014, 2016, 2018, and 2020.

References

Luxembourg
1979 disestablishments in Luxembourg
Human rights abuses in Luxembourg